Thoovalkattu is a 2010 Malayalam film directed by Venu B Nair starring Manoj K. Jayan and Lakshmi Gopalaswami in the lead roles.

Plot
Sundaran, who is the lead character in this movie. On contrary to his name, he is quite an unattractive person. Still he has managed to win the heart of Devu. Hajiyar is another character in the movie is less of an employee and more of an elder brother to Sundaran. Hajiyar's daughter happens to confront a few terrorists who blows up a mansion in the village.

Cast
 Manoj K. Jayan as  N.K Sundaran
 Lakshmi Gopalaswami as Devu
 Jagadish as Vanduran
 Anu Anad as Devan
 Indrans
 Sai Kumar as Hajiyar
 Bindu Panicker as Sarabi
 Sukumari

References

External links

Nowrunning.com
Popcorn.oneindia.in
Cinefundas.com
Cinecurry.com
Thoovalkkattu Songs on Devaragam.com
Filmibeat.com

2010 films
2010s Malayalam-language films